In mathematics, a cuspidal cubic or semicubical parabola is an algebraic plane curve that has an implicit equation of the form

(with ) in some Cartesian coordinate system.

Solving for  leads to the explicit form

which imply that every real point satisfies . The exponent explains the term semicubical parabola. (A parabola can be described by the equation .)

Solving the implicit equation for  yields a second explicit form

The parametric equation

can also be deduced from the implicit equation by putting  

The semicubical parabolas have a cuspidal singularity; hence the name of cuspidal cubic.

The arc length of the curve was calculated by the English mathematician William Neile and published in 1657 (see section History).

Properties of semicubical parabolas

Similarity 
Any semicubical parabola  is similar to the semicubical unit parabola 

Proof: The similarity  (uniform scaling) maps the semicubical parabola  onto the curve  with

Singularity 
The parametric representation  is regular except at point  At point  the curve has a singularity (cusp). The proof follows from the tangent vector  Only for  this vector has zero length.

Tangents 
Differentiating the semicubical unit parabola  one gets at point  of the upper branch the equation of the tangent:

This tangent intersects the lower branch at exactly one further point with coordinates  

(Proving this statement one should use the fact, that the tangent meets the curve at  twice.)

Arclength 
Determining the arclength of a curve  one has to solve the integral  For the semicubical parabola  one gets 

(The integral can be solved by the substitution 

Evolute of the unit parabola 
The evolute of the parabola  is a semicubical parabola shifted by 1/2 along the x-axis:

Polar coordinates 
In order to get the representation of the semicubical parabola  in polar coordinates, one determines the intersection point of the line  with the curve. For  there is one point different from the origin:  This point has distance  from the origin.

Relation between a semicubical parabola and a cubic function 
Mapping the semicubical parabola  by the projective map  (involutoric perspectivity with axis  and center  yields  hence the cubic function  The cusp (origin) of the semicubical parabola is exchanged with the point at infinity of the y-axis.

One gets the equation of the curve 
in homogeneous coordinates: 
Choosing line  as line at infinity and introducing  yields the (affine) curve

Isochrone curve 
An additional defining property of the semicubical parabola is that it is an isochrone curve, meaning that a particle following its path while being pulled down by gravity travels equal vertical intervals in equal time periods. In this way it is related to the tautochrone curve, for which particles at different starting points always take equal time to reach the bottom, and the brachistochrone curve, the curve that minimizes the time it takes for a falling particle to travel from its start to its end.

History
The semicubical parabola was discovered in 1657 by William Neile who computed its arc length. Although the lengths of some other non-algebraic curves including the logarithmic spiral and cycloid had already been computed (that is, those curves had been rectified), the semicubical parabola was the first algebraic curve (excluding the line and circle) to be rectified.

References 

August Pein: Die semicubische oder Neil'sche Parabel, ihre Sekanten und Tangenten , 1875, Dissertation
 Clifford A. Pickover: The Length of Neile's Semicubical Parabola

External links

Plane curves